Hidden Generations is a term used to describe a group of Indigenous peoples who responded to colonial forces in Australia by reducing their visibility. Although the term is relatively new in public conversation, it describes a very established pattern of behaviour. The emergence of the term is an outcome of this group of Indigenous people once again asserting their cultural identity. 

Hiding was seen by many Indigenous peoples as the best of the poor options available to ensure safety for their families and continuity of their lineages. Events that prompted these strategies included child removals (resulting in the Stolen Generations), restrictions of movements on missions and reserves, dispossession of land, massacres, and the introduction of foreign disease. Hidden Generation people hid in a number of ways – at times they hid physically, at other times they hid their identity and cultural practices.

Aboriginal peoples often experienced discrimination as a result of government policies, such as assimilation, which led to Indigenous people being regarded as inferior to non-Indigenous people. In this context, some families determined that, for the safety of their children, it was best to hide their children's identities. These children grew up unaware of their Indigenous heritage. Some families relocated from their traditional lands to places where they were unknown. Some hid in plain sight from colonial society by claiming to be of another heritage, one that was less discriminated against by colonial Australia. 

These strategies meant that families avoided becoming Stolen Generations, or being removed from Country to reserves or missions. Families were kept together, often on Country or in the bush. As a result they were able to continue to share cultural knowledge and family stories, and to maintain traditional familial structures and cultural practices, albeit in a less visible way. The disadvantages of this strategy included disconnection from wider kin networks. 

Many Aboriginal families who were Hidden Generation are now reclaiming their Aboriginal identities and connections to Country. This includes reinvigorating their links with their broader kin, clan and nation groups, and maintaining their culture in the open once again. Danièle Hromek (Budawang/Yuin) writes of this experience and its impact:Nor will I be referring to my culture as having been lost. It was not lost; it was forcibly silenced through the processes of colonisation. My family and ancestors faced these forces with an incredible, creative and beautiful resilience and resisted them, passing on knowledges and practices in often hidden and discreet ways until, in my generation, it was safe for them to re-emerge from the deep sleep in which they were being kept safe. Until the land and descendants of the land no longer exist, our culture always was and always will be. Hiding is a strategy that began in the early days of colonisation. In the book Hidden in Plain View Paul Irish describes how Aboriginal people were ignored in colonial narratives, despite being prominent in early colonial Sydney, and re-emerged a century later when government intervention was on the increase. Irish writes that, although Aboriginal people were mostly absent from colonial writings, they maintained a strong connection with the land and its resources, and tried to live on their own terms.  

While in part responding to the impacts experienced by the Stolen Generations, the Hidden Generations are different from the Stolen Generations. Claire G. Coleman (Wirlomin Noongar) explains this difference in relation to her father, Graham Coleman (Noongar), who she says is a member of the Hidden Generation: My immediate family are among the few with no history of children being taken; we don't carry stories of wailing mothers, of children screaming as the welfare man, the police, the so-called 'protectors' took them. Secrecy and lies with intergenerational ramifications kept my father safe from the worst of the government's genocidal intent; kept him from the long arm of the law; kept me and my siblings safe too.

Those secrets continued for most of Dad's life, protecting me and my family; they continued after children had ceased being stolen, because it's hard to break the habit of decades. My grandfather did what he thought was best for his family. He could not have known, would not have imagined, the long-term ramifications of his protection.

Publication and dissemination 
Many Indigenous people are now speaking and publishing about their family stories and experiences. The term Hidden Generation is becoming increasingly widespread as the experiences of these groups become acknowledged and recognised.    

Sally Morgan (Palku and Nyamal) discusses hiding identity due to shame in her book My Place. Harassment from Fisheries and the general public deterred South Coast Aboriginal people from fishing, causing shame and anger as their culture became criminalised as something to hide and practice in secret. Eileen Alberts (Gunditjmara) describes how her aunt, Aunty Connie Hart, used to watch in secret as her mother wove, thereby keeping their weaving practice alive. In the play Winyanboga Yurringa, Andrea James (Yorta Yorta/Kurnai) describes how women wove in the dark to keep the practice alive.

Shannon Foster (D'harawal) describes her family's experiences as follows:  Our story does more than just highlight the government's assimilation policies, it also interrogates the dichotomy of the Aboriginal experience that says you either grew up on a mission or you were Stolen Generations. There are other lived experiences made up of mission refugees, runners, and those swept up in the policies of assimilation, in the hope of a better life for our children. We created our own communities forged by the intended destruction of that which we would not allow to be destroyed. My father was not stolen from his immediate family, he was stolen from his community of origin, but he created another one around us, drawing in the love and respect of an extended family of wonderful aunties and uncles that helped him preserve culture and pass it onto us just as our Ancestors have done for generations before him.  Elder Aunty Frances Bodkin (Bidigal/D'harawal) calls the Hidden Generations the Dudbaya'ora – the Hidden Ones. Her son, Gawaian Bodkin-Andrews (Bidigal/D'harawal), says, "the Hidden Generations are those whose Bloodlines sit in the often-ignored ether between the missions and the Stolen Generations." 

Danièle Hromek writes about her family's experience: In my family, not only were our children sent to hide from welfare and other government organisations in the bush, they were also hidden in plain sight, disguised for their own safety. Irrespective of being hidden, our knowledges and ways of being, as well as our cultural and performative practices, were often passed on to us in a hidden yet safe way to ensure these were maintained for future generations, to be reclaimed when it was once again safe.

References 

British colonisation of Oceania
Indigenous peoples of Australia
